APA (also known as Agency for the Performing Arts) is one of the largest diversified talent agencies in the entertainment industry with headquarters in Los Angeles, New York, Nashville, Atlanta, Toronto and London. Founded in 1962 by a group of former MCA agents in New York, the company represents actors, writers, producers, showrunners, directors, performers, physical production services, film studios, and luxury and lifestyle brands across all media platforms worldwide.  The agency also packages feature films and television series such as Away on Netflix, The Dublin Murders on Showtime, All Rise on CBS, and For Life on ABC, as well as classic TV series Home Improvement and Roseanne. APA was one of the first among the top 5 packaging agencies to sign The WGA's new franchise agreement on January 21, 2020, when the agency integrated its Television and Motion Picture departments under one APA Scripted Literary banner.

History 
APA was founded in New York in 1962 by former MCA executives David Baumgarten (c. 1917–1995), Roger Vorce (1929–2018) and Harvey Litwin (1931–2020). Early clients included The Doors, Harry Belafonte, Johnny Cash, Tina Turner, Steve Martin, Janis Joplin, Jefferson Airplane, Rosemary Clooney and Liberace.

Current 
The agency's divisions include Alternative & Factual Programming, Scripted Literary, Talent, Intellectual Property, Branding Partnerships, Comedy & Live Podcasts, Concert Touring, Physical Production, Theater and Speakers. APA is the 5th largest talent agency in the United States after Creative Artists Agency, United Talent Agency, William Morris Endeavor, and ICM Partners. They are larger in size than Paradigm Talent Agency, The Gersh Agency, Innovative Artists, Abrams Artists Agency, and Don Buchwald & Associates. On September 4, 2020, financier Ron Burkle's Yucaipa Companies made a strategic non-equity financial investment in APA to support the continued growth of the agency's core business of talent representation.

The agency's on-camera and theatrical talent include such actors as Academy Award, Golden Globe and SAG Award-winning Gary Oldman (Mank, Darkest Hour), Academy Award, Golden Globe, SAG Award nominated, Grammy and NAACP Award-winning Mary J. Blige (Mudbound, Power Book II: Ghost), Academy Award-winning Mira Sorvino (Hollywood, Stuber), Grammy and Billboard Award-winning Curtis "50 Cent" Jackson (Power franchise), SAG Award-winning and Emmy Award nominated Lili Taylor (The Conjuring, Perry Mason), Award-winning Kate Bosworth (Superman Returns, Still Alice), Emmy Award nominated Anne Heche (The Vanished, Chicago PD), Famke Janssen (X-Men franchise), Tyrese Gibson (Fast & Furious), Academy Award-winning Richard Dreyfuss (Madoff), Cole Hauser (Yellowstone), Tony, Golden Globe and Academy Award-winning James Earl Jones (The Lion King), Emmy Award-winning Eddie Izzard (Victoria & Abdul), and Lucas Till (MacGuyver).

APA has been a driving force behind such non-fiction series as Dance Moms (Lifetime), Leah Remini: Scientology and the Aftermath (A&E), Dr. Pimple Popper (TLC), Unidentified (History), and Blown Away (Netflix). The agency also represents the Executive Producers of hit non-fiction series such as Nailed It (Netflix), So You Think You Can Dance (Fox), Let’s Make a Deal (CBS), and Pyramid (ABC).

The agency's Concert Touring division represents a diversified list of talented performers across all music genres with departments that include Adult Contemporary, Contemporary, Country, Jazz, and Rhythmic Contemporary.

The agency also reps numerous authors and storytellers in the area intellectual property, whose works have been adapted for film, streaming, television and Broadway, including bestselling author Gregory Maquire (Wicked, Egg & Spoon), #1 New York Times bestselling author Lee Child (Jack Reacher books), #1 New York Times bestselling author Charlaine Harris (True Blood, Midnight, Texas, Aurora Teagarden Mysteries), #1 New York Times bestselling fantasy author Brandon Sanderson (Mistborn), #1 New York Times bestselling author C.J. Box (The Highway, adapted by David E. Kelley for the ABC series “Big Sky”), bestselling author James Rollins (Sigma Force franchise), Patrick O’Brian (Master & Commander), New York Times bestselling author and National Book Award winner Neal Shusterman (Challenger Deep), the Truman Capote estate, and the Richard Wright estate, among others.

Controversies
In 2017, then APA agent Tyler Grasham was accused of assaulting several current or former child actors, including Blaise Godbe Lipman (who stated that Grasham assaulted him ten years earlier when he was looking for representation) and Lucas Ozarowski, a film and TV editor who stated that he was also assaulted by Grasham. Stranger Things actor Finn Wolfhard, who was represented by Grasham at the time, parted ways with both the agent and APA in the wake of the allegations. After a prompt investigation, the agency terminated Grasham's employment.

In 2017, a former agent of APA accused the agency of sexual discrimination, harassment and assault, alleging that a partner at the firm sent her graphic text messages and threatened to have her fired for refusing the advances. A private investigation commissioned by APA concluded that the agent fabricated her claims to extort money from the agency. APA subsequently filed a Demand for Arbitration pursuant to the agent's employment agreement. In response, the former agent filed a lawsuit with the California Superior Court, citing the same allegations. APA successfully moved to compel the matter be decided by arbitration.

In 2020 APA's president Jim Osborne and his client, Oscar winner actor Gary Oldman, became defendants in a lawsuit brought by scriptwriter Ben Kaplan over the script for the film Darkest Hour. Other defendants in the ongoing case include NBC Universal, producer Douglas Urbanski, Working Title Film Group and Focus Features. Ben Kaplan claims the defendants plagiarized part of an original screenplay about Winston Churchill that he'd spent years developing, with drafts to which the defendants had had access. He also claims Mr. Oldman had signed to his Churchill script before dropping the project and joining Darkest Hour.

References

External links 
 
 IMDBPro Information

Talent and literary agencies
Companies based in Beverly Hills, California